Hopeless Fountain Kingdom (stylized in all lowercase) is the second studio album by American singer-songwriter Halsey. It was released on June 2, 2017, through Astralwerks. The album features guest appearances from Quavo, Lauren Jauregui and Cashmere Cat. Halsey co-wrote every song on the album, while production was handled by Lido and Benny Blanco, among others. Following its release, Hopeless Fountain Kingdom debuted at number one on the Billboard 200 albums chart in the United States and the Canadian Albums Chart. The album was also certified 2× Platinum by the Recording Industry Association of America (RIAA) in the US. In support of the album, Halsey embarked on the Hopeless Fountain Kingdom Tour (2017–2018). The album was described by Halsey as having more "radio friendly music" when compared to her previous releases. As a result, Hopeless Fountain Kingdom is primarily a pop and R&B record and features synth-pop and electropop.

The album's lead single, "Now or Never", was released on April 4, 2017. It peaked at number 17 on the US Billboard Hot 100, marking Halsey's first top-twenty entry on the chart as a lead artist. It also became Halsey's first track as a lead artist to earn multi-Platinum status; it was certified double Platinum by the RIAA. The second single, "Bad at Love", peaked at number five on the Hot 100, making it Halsey's highest peak as a lead artist on the chart at the time. It was certified quintuple Platinum by the RIAA. The third and final single, "Alone", reached number 66 on the Hot 100, was certified Platinum by the RIAA and reached number one on the US Dance Club Songs chart.

Background and musical style
Hopeless Fountain Kingdom is a concept album that connects with their previous album Badlands, and Halsey has explained various parallels between lyrics on songs from both albums. Halsey also hinted that something on the album was inspired by the song "Empty Gold" from her 2014 debut EP Room 93. Hopeless Fountain Kingdom's story and characters are mostly inspired by William Shakespeare's play Romeo and Juliet, with the opening track "The Prologue" featuring the play's prologue spoken by Halsey. Inspiration for the album has also come from Halsey removing themself from a toxic relationship.

The album is noted for swapping the genders of Romeo and Juliet and including same sex relationships. The main character is a bisexual female named Luna Aureum (Luna meaning "moon"), and her main love interest is male character Solis Angelus (Solis meaning "sun"), with references to female love interests in the songs "Bad at Love" and "Strangers", featuring Lauren Jauregui who is bisexual herself.

Billboard has pointed out that the album title might be named after a real fountain built by Halsey's ex-boyfriend off the L train's Halsey Street stop in Brooklyn.

In the behind-the-scenes video for the first single, "Now or Never", Halsey revealed that the Hopeless Fountain Kingdom is a sort of purgatory for people who are too bad for heaven, but too good for hell. Luna and Solis are rumored to be the only two people born inside the Kingdom. The music video for "Now or Never" was heavily influenced by Baz Luhrmann's 1996 film adaptation of the play, Romeo + Juliet.

Musically, Halsey stated that she didn't want her first album to be a radio album and that although this album has a more radio-friendly sound she still sees herself as an alternative artist; Halsey also said that she is "more than capable of writing radio music". For this album, Halsey worked with several producers, including Greg Kurstin, Benny Blanco and Ricky Reed. The record is mainly rooted in pop music and R&B, specifically synth-pop and electropop, with "trap-pop vibes".

Promotion
Halsey referenced the album as early as 2014, posting "(and the Kingdom)" on Twitter, and in 2016 when playing in Madison Square Garden she displayed the words "you can find me in the Kingdom" on a screen. In February 2017, she invited 100 fans in London to a church to hear four new songs from the album.

In March, multiple Twitter accounts connected to Halsey began hinting at a storyline present in the album, seemingly involving two characters named Luna and Solis belonging to two different houses called the House of Aureum and the House of Angelus. Soon after the tweets were released, Halsey began mailing out quotes from Romeo and Juliet to fans. In the first song on the album titled "The Prologue," Halsey recites the beginning lines of the play. The story of Luna and Solis in Hopeless Fountain Kingdom takes significant influence from William Shakespeare's Romeo and Juliet, in particular the Baz Luhrmann directed adaptation Romeo + Juliet. Halsey and Luhrmann would later be interviewed by Beats 1's Zane Lowe about their respective adaptation processes.

The album was announced on March 7, 2017, via Halsey's Twitter account, along with a photograph of her holding a rose, and on March 23, announced the release date of June 2, 2017. To release the album cover, she had a global scavenger hunt, where miniature gun shaped USB's were hidden in 9 cities around the world with pieces of the cover. When all the pieces were found, they revealed the album cover art along with the announcement of the first single, "Now or Never". On May 16, 2017, Halsey hinted via her Twitter account that the album would be accompanied by a series of connected music videos.

Singles
The album's lead single, "Now or Never", was released on April 4, 2017, along with its pre-order. The same day, the song's music video, co-directed by Halsey with Sing J Lee, was premiered. The single debuted at number 50 on the US Billboard Hot 100. It became her first single as a lead artist to reach the top 40 and her first since "Closer". The song later peaked at number 17.

"Bad at Love" was announced by Halsey on her Twitter account as the next single off the album. It has peaked at number five in the US, making it her highest peaking solo song, until her October 2018 single, "Without Me", from her next studio album, Manic (2020), reached number one in January 2019.

A remixed version of "Alone" was announced by Halsey on her Twitter as the album's third single, featuring rappers Big Sean and Stefflon Don. The song peaked at number 66 on the Billboard Hot 100.

Promotional singles
On May 4, 2017, "Eyes Closed" was released as the first promotional single.

On May 26, Halsey confirmed "Strangers", featuring Lauren Jauregui, as the second official promotional single. It debuted at number 100 on the Billboard Hot 100. It became Halsey's sixth entry and Jauregui's first as a solo artist.

Other songs
On February 2, 2018, Halsey released the music video for somber piano track "Sorry" as "something to hold u over". The video has racked up over 120 million views to date.

Critical reception

At Metacritic, which assigns a normalized rating out of 100 to reviews from mainstream critics, the album has an average score of 66 out of 100, indicating "generally favorable reviews" based on 10 reviews.

Rob Sheffield from Rolling Stone stated Halsey "shows off all her wild musical ambitions" on her "bold" second album. "It's her sprawling science-fiction breakup tale, indulging her taste for wide-screen melodrama." Musically, he opined the singer is "going for adult dystopian synth-pop realness." For The Observer, Kitty Empire noted Halsey's "generic guest spot on a massive 2016 hit by the Chainsmokers, 'Closer', was an omen" as the album "does succumb to post-hit syndrome. It is not remotely bad; it certainly sounds just like one of the most hotly awaited pop albums of 2017. But you can discern, just off stage, the chorus of unignorable industry types bearing down on one bankable creative, advising this timely collaboration, that hot producer, this set of references."

Jon Caramanica in The New York Times opined it "liberally borrows styles from other singers." He highlighted "where Halsey sets herself apart is in her subject matter and manner of delivery. Her tales have rough edges and ellipsis endings," however, "there isn't a flicker of musical edge on this album, only a belief in the crowdsourcing of ideas." USA Todays Maeve McDermott expressed similar sentiments in a mixed review, noting that the album "borrows magpie-like from other stars' signature sounds, with some working better than others."

Commercial performance
Hopeless Fountain Kingdom debuted at number one on the US Billboard 200 with 106,000 album-equivalent units, of which 76,000 were pure album sales. This feat made Halsey the first female act in 2017 to open atop the chart. In Australia, the album debuted at number two with first-week sales of 4,300 copies. The album debuted at number 12 on the UK Albums Chart, selling 7,123 copies in its first week.

Track listing
Credits adapted from the album's liner notes

Notes
  signifies a co-producer
  signifies an additional producer

Sample credits
 "Alone" contains a sample from "Nothing Can Stop Me from Loving You", written by Tony Hester and recorded by Marilyn McCoo and Billy Davis Jr.

Personnel
Credits adapted from the deluxe edition of Hopeless Fountain Kingdom.

Performers and musicians

Halsey – vocals
Quavo – vocals 
Lauren Jauregui – vocals 
Big Sean — vocals 
Stefflon Don — vocals 
Cashmere Cat – featured artist , instruments , keyboards 
Kiara Ana – viola 
Benny Blanco – instruments , keyboards 
Rogét Chahayed – instruments 
Dante Frangipane – spoken word 
Ezra Kurstin – voices 
Greg Kurstin – drums , guitar , keyboards , mellotron , piano , chamberlin , rhodes 
Lido – instruments , keyboards 
Alexandra McKoy – spoken word 
Happy Perez – instruments , guitar 
Ricky Reed – instruments 
Starrah – background vocals 
Chyrsanthe Tan – violin 
Adrienne Woods – cello 

Production

Benny Blanco – production , programming 
Julian Burg – recording 
Josh Carter – co-production , programming 
Cashmere Cat – production , programming 
Rogét Chahayed – additional production 
Chris Gehringer – mastering
Serban Ghenea – mixing
 Mac Attkinson – recording engineer 
 Amadxus – assistant recording engineer 
 ATM the engineer – assistant recording engineer 
John Hanes – engineered for mix
Seif Hussain – production coordination 
Greg Kurstin – production , recording , drum programming 
Lido – production , recording , programming 
Andrew Luftman – production coordination 
Alex Pasco – recording 
Happy Perez – production , programming 
Ricky Reed – production , programming 
Dave Schwerkolt – recording 
Ben Sedano – recording 
Sarah Shelton – production coordination 
Ethan Shumaker – recording 

Design

Garrett Hilliker – art direction
Brian Ziff – photography

Charts

Weekly charts

Year-end charts

Certifications

References

2017 albums
Astralwerks albums
Concept albums
Halsey (singer) albums
Albums produced by Greg Kurstin
Albums produced by Benny Blanco
Albums produced by Cashmere Cat
Albums produced by Happy Perez
LGBT-related adaptations of works by William Shakespeare
LGBT-related albums
Works based on Romeo and Juliet